Events from the year 1696 in Denmark

Incumbents
 Monarch – Christian V

Events
 19 April – Church of Our Saviour on Christianshavn in Copenhagen is inaugurated.

Full date missing
 The Thisted witch trial, referred to as the last witch trials in Denmark, begins in Thisted.

Births
 22 June – Joost van Hemert, merchant  and ship-owner (died 1775)

Full date missing

Deaths
 28 June – Eiler Holck, baron and military officer (born 1627)

Full date missing
 Peder Lauridsen Kylling, botanist (born 1640)

References

 
Denmark
Years of the 17th century in Denmark